is a weekly shōnen manga anthology published on Wednesdays in Japan by Kodansha, first published on March 17, 1959. The magazine is mainly read by an older audience, with a significant portion of its readership falling under the male high school or college student demographic. According to circulation figures accumulated by the Japanese Magazine Publishers Association, the magazine's circulation has dropped in every quarter since records were first collected in April–June 2008. This is, however, not an isolated occurrence as digital media continues to be on the rise.

It is one of the best-selling manga magazines. In addition, about  compiled tankōbon volumes had been sold by March 2008.

Jason Thompson stated that it is "more down-to-earth, as well as just a tad more guy-oriented" compared to Weekly Shōnen Jump and likened this magazine to "more like something you'd find in the guys' locker room."

Features

Series

There are currently 26 manga titles being serialized in Weekly Shōnen Magazine. Out of them, Ahiru no Sora is on hiatus.

Circulation

Reception

The Weekly Shōnen Magazine achieved success in the 1970s and subsequently had increased sales. As a result, it became the top-selling manga magazine in Japan of its period, appearing popular amongst many otaku. But the position was later occupied by Weekly Shōnen Jump, when this competitor was born in 1968, knocking Shōnen Magazine off the top spot. Shōnen Jump had begun to circulate and dominate the manga magazine market. This started from the 1970s and continued throughout the 1990s, owed mainly to Akira Toriyama's Dragon Ball.

In the middle of the 1990s, Shōnen Jump suffered the loss of Dragon Ball, as the franchise had come to an end in 1996, and thus lost much of its readership. Shōnen Magazine had now made a comeback in October 1997, regaining its original position as the top-selling manga magazine of its day until this was brokered in 2002. Currently, the two magazines have competed closely in terms of market circulation. Sales of the two magazines now remain very close. Circulation has dropped below two million. In a rare event due to the closeness of the two magazine's founding dates, Weekly Shōnen Magazine and Weekly Shōnen Sunday released a special combined issue on March 19, 2008. In addition, other commemorative events, merchandise, and manga crossovers were planned for the following year as part of the celebrations.

Others include Shōnen Magazine, published by Kobunsha of the same Kodansha group. Shōnen Magazine famously serialized Tetsujin 28-go, the first mecha anime from July 1956 to May 1966.

See also

 List of manga magazines
 Shonen Magz, Indonesian version
 Sunday vs Magazine: Shūketsu! Chōjō Daikessen (video game)

References

External links 
  

Weekly manga magazines published in Japan
Magazines established in 1959
Kodansha magazines
1959 establishments in Japan
Shōnen manga magazines